Jeanne-Adélaïde Gérardin (1764–1787), stage name Jeanne Olivier, was a French stage actress.  

She was engaged at the Comédie-Française in 1780. She became a Sociétaires of the Comédie-Française in 1781.  

She had a successful career at the theatre where she was a star attraction and created seventeen celebrated ingénue-roles during her career there.

References

External links 
  Jeanne Olivier, Comédie-Française

1764 births
1787 deaths
18th-century French actresses
French stage actresses